UB or Ub may refer to:

Organizations
Basel University Library, abbreviated UB.
UltimateBet, a defunct online poker site
Ungermann-Bass, a computer networking company in California
United Biscuits, a British and European food manufacturer
United Breweries Group, a brewery conglomerate in India
Urząd Bezpieczeństwa (1945–1954), part of the Polish secret police
Church of the United Brethren in Christ, also known as the United Brethren
Myanmar National Airlines, IATA code UB
Urban Behavior, defunct Canadian retailer

Places
Ub, Serbia, a town in Serbia
Ub (river), a river in Serbia
UB postcode area, in London, England
Ulaanbaatar (Ulan Bator), Mongolia

Universities
University of Bridgeport, Connecticut, US
Bakrie University, Jakarta, Indonesia
University at Buffalo, New York, US
University of Baguio, Philippines
University of the Bahamas
University of Ballarat, Victoria, Australia
University of Baltimore, Maryland, US
University of Barcelona, Catalonia, Spain
University of Basrah, Iraq
University of Batangas, Philippines
University of Belgrade, Serbia
University of Belgrano, Argentina
University of Birmingham, UK
University of Bohol, Philippines
University of Botswana
University of Brawijaya, Malang, Indonesia
University of Buckingham, Buckinghamshire, UK
University of Buea, Buea, Cameroon
University of Burgundy, France

Science and technology
 Berezin UB, a Soviet World War II machine gun
 Ubiquitin, a small regulatory protein
 Undefined behavior, in computer science, operations that are unspecified
 Universal Beam, a type of I-beam
 Upper bound, a mathematical concept in order theory

Other uses
 Ub Iwerks (1901–1971), American animator and cartoonist
 Ugly Betty, an American drama-comedy television series
 German submarine UB, German name for the captured British submarine HMS Seal (N37)
 German Type UB submarine
 Upward Bound, a United States Department of Education-sponsored program
 The Urantia Book, a spiritual and philosophical book published in 1955
 U.S.C. de Bananier, Guadeloupean football club in Capesterre-Belle-Eau
 U.S. Bitonto, an Italian association football club in Bitonto, Apulia

See also
Ubo (disambiguation)
Ubu (disambiguation)
OOB (disambiguation)
 U of B